The Love Has Never Gone: Tribute to Earth, Wind & Fire is a tribute album to the R&B band Earth, Wind & Fire by jazz group the  Lenny White Project which was released in 2004 upon Trauma Records.

Overview
With Kaz Hori as its executive producer, the album was also    co-produced by Dave Burrell and Lenny White altogether.

Track listing 
"Evil" 	         (Bailey, White) 	4:51
"Fantasy"  (Barrio, White, White) 	8:46
"Earth, Wind & Fire" 	                            (Scarborough, White) 	7:06
"After the Love Has Gone" 	             (Champlin, Foster, Graydon) 	7:49
"See the Light" 	                           (Bailey, Dunn, Hardy) 	7:11
"Runnin'" 	                                (DelBarrio, Dunn, White) 	5:44
"Spirit" 	                                           (Dunn, White) 	6:23
"Getaway" 	   (Cor, Taylor) 	6:59

Personnel

Steve Boyer -	 Engineer 
Dave Burrell	- Producer 
Kaz Hori -	 Executive Producer 
Bireli Lagrene	- Guitar 
Antoine Roney	- Saxophone 
Wallace Roney	- Trumpet 
Vanessa Rubin	- Vocals 
Patrice Rushen - Arranger 
Kelvin Sholar	- Arranger
Lenny White - Arranger, Drums, Producer 
Scott Young -	Assistant Engineer

References

2004 albums
Lenny White albums
Earth, Wind & Fire tribute albums
Trauma Records albums